Vernon Mill, Stockport is a former cotton spinning mill in Portwood, Stockport, Greater Manchester, England. Built in 1881, it was taken over by the Lancashire Cotton Corporation in 1930 and later sold on. Although still in business use, it is now a grade II listed building.

Location
Stockport is a large town in Greater Manchester, England. The town of Stockport is the largest settlement within the Metropolitan Borough of Stockport.

Historically a part of Cheshire, Stockport in the 16th century was a small town entirely on the south bank of the Mersey, and known for the cultivation of hemp and the manufacture of rope. In the 18th century, the town had one of the first mechanised silk factories in the United Kingdom. However, Stockport's predominant industries of the 19th century were the cotton and allied industries. The Stockport Branch of the Ashton Canal terminated at the top of Lancashire Hill, in Heaton Norris, but Stockport was rich in railway connections. The Cheshire Lines Committee ran the Stockport, Timperley and Altrincham Junction Railway which serviced Portwood and Stockport Tiviot Dale railway station.

Portwood to the east of the town centre, alongside the River Goyt, was the location of many of Stockports Mills, and Vernon Mill was adjacent to the Palmer Mills. Vernon Mill was on Mersey Street, reflecting the view at the time that the River Mersey started upstream at the confluence of the Goyt and the River Etherow.

History
The mill was designed by architects Joseph Stott and Son. The foundation stone was laid on 31 October 1881, it was the first limited liability cotton mill to open in Stockport.

The industry peaked in 1912 when it produced 8 billion yards of cloth. The First World War (1914–18) halted the supply of raw cotton, and the British government encouraged its colonies to build mills to spin and weave cotton by themselves. Once the war was over, Lancashire never regained its markets and the independent mills were struggling. The Bank of England set up the Lancashire Cotton Corporation in 1929 to attempt to rationalise and save the industry. Vernon Mill, Stockport was one of 104 mills bought by the LCC, and one of the 53 mills that survived through to 1950. It is still standing, occupied by multiple businesses including a gym, a boxing gym, and various art studios. Vernon Mill was purchased by ZS Properties (Mcr) Ltd in October 2018.

Owners
Vernon Cotton Spinning Co
Vernon Mills (1920–1930)
Lancashire Cotton Corporation (1930–1964)
Courtaulds (1964–)
ZS Properties (Mcr) Ltd (2018- ) current owners

Tenants
Vernon Mill Artists, an artist led group with 43 active members working from studios

See also

Listed buildings in Stockport
Textile manufacturing

References

Bibliography

External links

 Cotton Town
 Spinning the Web

Textile mills in the Metropolitan Borough of Stockport
Buildings and structures in Stockport
Cotton mills
Former textile mills in the United Kingdom
Textile mills owned by the Lancashire Cotton Corporation